The Commonwealth of Massachusetts has 21 separate Registries of Deeds, each functioning in districts dealing with real estate registration and land records.  The registries are divided by county or subdivided within official state counties. These divisions are headed by elected officials known as a Register, and fall under the purview of the Secretary of the Commonwealth of Massachusetts and local county governments.

By county

Barnstable

Berkshire

Bristol

Dukes

Essex

Franklin

Hampden

Hampshire

Middlesex

Nantucket

Norfolk

Plymouth

Suffolk

Worcester

References

External links
 
 Locate my Registry of Deeds Office, Sec.state.ma.us
 Community, District, Neighborhood Section and Village, Names in Massachusetts Sec.state.ma.us

Local government in Massachusetts